Deggendorf is a Landkreis (district) in Bavaria, Germany. It is bordered by (from the north and clockwise) the districts of Regen, Freyung-Grafenau, Passau, Rottal-Inn, Dingolfing-Landau and Straubing-Bogen.

History
The district was established in 1936. Minor changes of the borders occurred in 1972 and led to the present form of the district.

Geography
The Danube river runs through the district from west to east, dividing it into two unequal regions. North of the Danube the Bavarian Forest rises steeply. In the south there is relatively plain countryside. The Isar river enters the district in the south and meets the Danube close to the town of Deggendorf. The Einödriegel (1,220 m) is the highest point within the county.

Coat of arms
The double eagle was the symbol of the monastery of Metten, which was the first Christian outpost in the region. The blue line stands for the river Danube, the green hills symbolise the Bavarian Forest.

Towns and municipalities

References

External links

Official website (German)

 
Districts of Bavaria
1936 establishments in Germany